Te Herenga Waka University Press or THWUP (formerly Victoria University Press) is the book publishing arm of Victoria University of Wellington, located in Wellington, New Zealand. As of 2022, the press had published around 800 books.

History
Victoria University Press was founded in the early 1970s, with a single staff member. Fergus Barrowman joined it in 1985 as publisher and remains in charge of the press. By 2005 the staff had grown to four and the press was publishing on average 15 titles a year. By 2011 this had grown to 25 titles annually, including six or seven poetry books.

In 2019, Victoria University adopted the Māori name Te Herenga Waka ("the mooring place of canoes"), which previously just referred to the university marae. To align with the university's name, the press changed its name as of 1 January 2022 to Te Herenga Waka University Press. It adopted a new logo, designed by Philip Kelly and Rangi Kipa, which uses the initials THW to evoke a whare whakairo (carved meeting house).

Publications
THWUP is a scholarly publisher specialising in New Zealand history and public affairs. It is also a significant publisher of New Zealand literary fiction and poetry. Its highlights include the novel The Luminaries by Eleanor Catton (2013 Man Booker Prize winner), Elizabeth Knox's The Absolute Book, poet Hera Lindsay Bird's bestselling debut Hera Lindsay Bird, and the poet Tayi Tibble. It has a backlist of over 400 books in print, and issues 32 new titles a year on average.

THWUP publishes vital work in New Zealand history. The history list, particularly social history, is viewed in broad, culturally diverse, and interdisciplinary terms, embracing studies of New Zealand's past and present and how these may shape the future.

Books on Māori topics include important collections of writings in Māori by major figures such as Hirini Moko Mead and Āpirana Ngata, as well as Dame Joan Metge's widely read books on contemporary Māori society and cross-cultural communication.

The press receives funding from Victoria University, which publisher Fergus Barrowman notes is extremely useful: "If we were independent with no funds at all it would be extremely hard. I don't know how some of New Zealand's independent publishers manage to do the books they do. University support is crucial for us. One of the great things is we can take commercial risks, like first books and short stories."

Notable authors
THWUP has published works of many of New Zealand's strongest and most vibrant poets, including:
 Fleur Adcock
Tusiata Avia
Hinemoana Baker
Hera Lindsay Bird
Jenny Bornholdt
James Brown
Kate Camp
Geoff Cochrane
Dinah Hawken
Bill Manhire (inaugural NZ Poet Laureate)
Vincent O'Sullivan
Tayi Tibble
Brian Turner
Ashleigh Young

THWUP has also published foremost writers such as: 
Pip Adam 
Barbara Anderson 
Eleanor Catton (2013 Man Booker prize winner) 
Catherine Chidgey
Bernadette Hall
Elizabeth Knox
 Bruce Mason
Tracey Slaughter
Damien Wilkins

Book series
Book series published by the press have included:
 New Zealand Playscripts 
 THW Classics 
 Victoria University of Wellington Inaugural Addresses
 VUP Classics

Awards

Books published by THWUP have won numerous Ockham New Zealand Book Awards such as:

 Airini Beautrais, Bug Week (2021 Jann Medlicott Acorn Foundation Prize for Fiction)
 Tusiata Avia, The Savage Coloniser Book (2021 Mary and Peter Biggs Prize for Poetry)
 Madison Hamill, Specimen (2021 EH McCormick Prize for General Non-fiction)
 Shayne Carter, Dead People I Have Known (2020 General Non-fiction Award winner and Best First Book of Non-fiction Award winner)
 Helen Heath, Are Friends Electric? (2019 Mary and Peter Biggs Prize for Poetry)
 Pip Adam, The New Animals (2018 Acorn Foundation Prize for Fiction)
 Catherine Chidgey, The Wish Child (2017 Acorn Foundation Prize for Fiction)
 Ashleigh Young, Can You Tolerate This? (2017 General Non-fiction Award winner)
 Andrew Johnston, Fits and Starts (2017 Poetry Award winner)
 Annaleese Jochems, Baby (2017 Hubert Church Prize for Fiction)
 David Coventry, The Invisible Mile (2016 Hubert Church Prize for Fiction)
 Eleanor Catton, The Luminaries (2014 Fiction Prize)
 Amy Head, Tough (2014 Hubert Church Prize for Fiction)
 Lawrence Patchett, I Got His Blood on Me (2013 Hubert Church Prize for Fiction) 
 Pip Adam, Everything We Hoped For (2011 Hubert Church Prize for Fiction)
 Kate Camp, The Mirror of Simple Annihilated Souls (2011 Poetry Award winner)
 Brian Turner, Just This (2010 Poetry Award winner)
 Anna Taylor, Relief (2010 NZSA Hubert Church Best First Book of Fiction Award Winner)
 Jenny Bornholdt, The Rocky Shore (2009 Poetry category winner)
 Richard Boast, Buying the Land, Selling the Land (2009 History category winner)
 Eleanor Catton, The Rehearsal (2009 NZSA Hubert Church Best First Book Award for Fiction)

References

External links
 Te Herenga Waka University Press - official website

Book publishing companies of New Zealand
University presses of New Zealand
Victoria University of Wellington
Publishing companies established in the 1970s
Mass media in Wellington